Paphiopedilum dayanum is a species of orchid endemic to Mount Kinabalu on Borneo.

Taxonomy 
It was named by John Lindley in Morph. Stud. Orchideenbl.: 11 in 1886.

References

External links 

dayanum
Orchids of Borneo
Endemic orchids of Malaysia
Plants described in 1860
Flora of Mount Kinabalu
Endemic flora of Borneo